François Watrin (29 January 1772 in Beauvais – 22 November 1802 in Port-au-Prince) was a French infantry commander during the French Revolutionary Wars.

French generals
French military personnel of the French Revolutionary Wars
French Republican military leaders of the French Revolutionary Wars
1772 births
1802 deaths
People from Beauvais
Names inscribed under the Arc de Triomphe